The Ministry of Science, Research and Technology (MSRT) is the government ministry of science, research and technology in the Islamic Republic of Iran. State-run (non-medical) universities of Iran are under the direct supervision of Iran's Ministry of Science, Research and Technology. The ministry was established in 2000 when the ministry of culture and higher education was renamed as the ministry of science, research and technology.

In 2000 the ministry set up the Aerospace Research Institute.

The supervision of higher education institutions and the approval of the study programmes, as well as the accreditation of universities and other higher education institutions are conducted by the Ministry of Science, Research and Technology. Medical education falls within the remit of the Ministry of Health, Treatment and Medical Education. A list of recognised universities and institutes of higher education and private institutions is available on the website of the Ministry of Science, Research and Technology.

Ministers since 1979

See also
 Higher education in Iran
 Science and technology in Iran
 Houchang Nahavandi

References

External links
 

2000 establishments in Iran
Iran
Science
Ministries established in 2000